Phyllonorycter lyoniae is a moth of the family Gracillariidae, described by Tosio Kumata in 1963. It is known from the islands of Shikoku, Kyushu and Honshu in Japan.

The wingspan is 6.5–7 mm.

The larvae feed as leaf miners on Lyonia ovalifolia var. elliptica. The mine is ptychonomous and situated along the margin or rarely on the space between two veins of the lower surface of the leaf.

References

Lyoniae
Moths described in 1963
Moths of Japan

Taxa named by Tosio Kumata
Leaf miners